Saulteaux 159 is an Indian reserve of the Saulteaux First Nation in Saskatchewan. It is 43 kilometres north of North Battleford. In the 2016 Canadian Census, it recorded a population of 473 living in 133 of its 142 total private dwellings. In the same year, its Community Well-Being index was calculated at 50 of 100, compared to 58.4 for the average First Nations community and 77.5 for the average non-Indigenous community.

References

Indian reserves in Saskatchewan
Division No. 17, Saskatchewan